The 1958–59 Norwegian 1. Divisjon season was the 20th season of ice hockey in Norway. Eight teams participated in the league, and Gamlebyen won the championship.

Regular season

External links 
 Norwegian Ice Hockey Federation

Nor
GET-ligaen seasons
1958 in Norwegian sport
1959 in Norwegian sport